Leila Sbitani  is an American host and actress. Leila's career has included hosting stints on Entertainment Tonight, E!, Style, WE, ION Television, Metro TV, Oxygen, and TV Land.  Leila's film credits include The Reunion, which was a winner at the New York International Independent Film and Video Festival, and Fractured.  Her favorite Regional Theatre roles are Kathleen in Terra Nova and Maggie in Lend Me a Tenor.

Actress-Filmography

TV Series-Non-Guest Star
Studio Y (1999) as Host
48 Hour Wedding (2002) as Host
Nice Package (2004) as Host
Hi-Jinks as Host
TV Land Awards-All Access (2011) as Host
Best Night In on TV Land as Host (2011–present)

Guest Star
Guiding Light as Kitty
All My Children as Iris
Apartment 2F as Stacey

Movies
Fractured (1996) as Jessie
The Reunion (1998) as Ashley
The Senator's Daughter (Web Series) (2011) as Nancy
Dead Man's Trigger (Web Series) (2012) as Agent Thomas

Commercials
Appeared in a series of more than 80 commercials for Belle Tire in Michigan from 1997 to 2001.  Eleven years later in the fall of 2012 Leila was brought back to do an additional series of Belle Tire commercials.  These commercials ran throughout 2013.

External links

Living people
American actresses
Year of birth missing (living people)
21st-century American women